Kill the Lights is the second and final full-length album by the synthpop rock band The New Cities. Released on September 27, 2011, it includes the single, "Heatwave", that was released to radio on June 16, 2011. Written by The New Cities and The Matrix, "Heatwave" has reached No. 38 on the Canadian Hot 100.

The album debuted at #52 in Canada.

Track listing

Singles

Personnel 

The New Cities
David Brown - Lead vocals 
Julien Martre - Backing vocals, Bassist 
Christian Bergeron - Guitarist 
Francis Fugere - Drums 
Nicolas Denis - Synth 
Philippe Lachance - Synth

Engineer 
Blake Healy
Christian Bergeron
Martin Brunet
Marc-Andre Roy
Pierre Remillard

Mixer
Joe Zook
Dave Ogilvie

Mastering
Pierre Remillard
Brian Gardner

Photographer
Raphael Ouellet

References

2011 albums
The New Cities albums
Sony Music Canada albums